The Men's points race at the 2014 UCI Track Cycling World Championships was held on 28 February 2014. 20 cyclists participated in the contest, which was contested over 160 laps, equating to a distance of .

Medalists

Results
The final was started at 20:25.

References

2014 UCI Track Cycling World Championships
UCI Track Cycling World Championships – Men's points race